Guinns Creek is a stream in southeastern Pike County of eastern Missouri. It is a tributary of Bryants Creek.

Guinns Creek has the name of George Guinn, the original owner of the site.

See also
List of rivers of Missouri

References

Rivers of Pike County, Missouri
Rivers of Missouri